Francis Thomas Purcell (August 11, 1918 – May 18, 2014) was a Republican politician who was county executive of Nassau County, New York (1978–87). He served as a trustee and also as mayor of the village of Malverne, was a member of the New York State Assembly, and supervisor of the town of Hempstead, New York, before becoming county executive in 1978. After resigning in 1987, Purcell became a political commentator for Cablevision's news channel News 12 Long Island. In 2004, a section of land formerly called Hempstead Plains was dedicated to Purcell in honor of his service and dedication to Nassau County.

Early life
Purcell was born in 1918 to Thomas (d. 1942) and Annette (d. 1972) Purcell  on 11 August 1918 in Brooklyn, New York. A star athlete at Malverne High School, he was signed to play baseball with the Brooklyn Dodgers but never played for them because he joined the army in 1941 and was discharged in 1945 with the rank of captain.

Career
Purcell was elected mayor of Malverne in 1955. In June 1964, he challenged the party designee in the Republican Party primary for Nassau's 1st district's seat in the New York State Assembly and won the nomination. He was a member of the State Assembly in 1965. On June 18, he was appointed as supervisor of the town of Hempstead, to fill the vacancy created by the appointment of Ralph G. Caso as presiding supervisor. Purcell was elected to the position in November 1965, and then reelected twice.

He was elected to the post of county executive of Nassau County in 1977. He secured the nomination of the Republican Party over fellow Republican and incumbent county executive Ralph G. Caso, who also opposed Purcell in the general election. He took office in January 1978. In the late 1970s and '80s, Purcell promoted the development of downtown Nassau County businesses, and oversaw the transformation of Mitchel field, a former air base, into a recreational and educational center.

Purcell easily won reelection in 1981 and 1985. In December 1986, near the end of the first year of his third term, he announced his retirement from politics and his intention to join Cablevision as a political analyst and commentator.

Personal
Purcell had 3 children, Patricia, Kim, and Diane, seven grandchildren, and eight great-grandchildren. He resided in West Palm Beach, Florida with his wife Barbara, where he died on May 18, 2014, aged 95.

References

1918 births
2014 deaths
Mayors of places in New York (state)
Nassau County Executives
Town supervisors in New York (state)
Republican Party members of the New York State Assembly
People from Brooklyn
People from Malverne, New York
People from West Palm Beach, Florida
Malverne High School alumni